The 2006–07 Euroleague was the 7th season of the professional basketball competition for elite clubs throughout Europe, organised by Euroleague Basketball Company, and it was the 50th season of the premier competition for European men's clubs overall. The season featured 24 competing teams from 13 countries.

The competition began on October 24, 2006, at the Olympic Pavilion in Badalona, Spain, with Panathinaikos winning 82-79 against DKV Joventut. The final of the competition was held on May 6, 2007, in the Olympic Indoor Hall in Athens, Greece, the home court of Panathinaikos, with Panathinaikos defeating the defending champions, CSKA Moscow, by a score of 93-91.

Teams 
As announced on the official Euroleague site.

Regular season 
The first phase was a regular season, in which the competing teams were drawn into three groups, each containing eight teams. Each team played every other team in its group at home and away, resulting in 14 games for each team in the first stage. The top 5 teams in each group and the best sixth-placed team advanced to the next round. The complete list of tiebreakers was provided in the lead-in to the Regular Season results.

If one or more clubs were level on won-lost record, tiebreakers were applied in the following order:
 Head-to-head record in matches between the tied clubs
 Overall point difference in games between the tied clubs
 Overall point difference in all group matches (first tiebreaker if tied clubs were not in the same group)
 Points scored in all group matches
 Sum of quotients of points scored and points allowed in each group match

Group C

Top 16 
The surviving teams were divided into four groups of four teams each, and again a round robin system was adopted, resulting in 6 games each, with the two top teams advancing to the quarterfinals. Tiebreakers were identical to those used in the Regular Season.

The draw was held February 5, at 13:00 CET (1200 UTC) in Barcelona, in accordance with Euroleague rules.

The teams were placed into four pools, as follows:

Level 1: The three group winners, plus the top-ranked second-place team
 CSKA Moscow, Tau Cerámica, Panathinaikos, Dynamo Moscow
Level 2: The remaining second-place teams, plus the top two third-place teams
 Winterthur FC Barcelona, Maccabi Elite Tel Aviv, Olympiacos, Benetton Treviso
Level 3: The remaining third-place team, plus the three fourth-place teams
 DKV Joventut, Efes Pilsen, Pau-Orthez, Unicaja
Level 4: The fifth-place teams, plus the top ranked sixth-place team
 Lottomatica Roma, Aris TT Bank, Prokom Trefl Sopot, Partizan

Each Top 16 group included one team from each pool. The draw was conducted under the following restrictions:
 No more than two teams from the same Regular Season group could be placed in the same Top 16 group.
 No more than two teams from the same country could be placed in the same Top 16 group.
 If there is a conflict between these two restrictions, (1) would receive priority.

Another draw was held to determine the order of fixtures. In the case of two teams from the same city in the Top 16 (CSKA Moscow and Dynamo Moscow, Panathinaikos and Olympiacos, FC Barcelona and Joventut Badalona) they were scheduled so that every week only one team would be at home.

Quarterfinals 

Each quarterfinal was a best-of-three series between a first-place team in the Top 16 and a second-place team from a different group, with the first-place team receiving home advantage. Quarterfinals were played on April 3 and 5, 2007, with third games to be played April 12 if necessary.

|}

Final four

Semifinals 
May 4, Olympic Indoor Hall, Athens

|}

3rd place game 
May 6, Olympic Indoor Hall, Athens

|}

Final 
May 6, Olympic Indoor Hall, Athens

|}

Final standings

Final Four 2007 MVP 
 Dimitris Diamantidis (Panathinaikos)

Individual statistics

Rating

Points

Rebounds

Assists

Other Stats

Game highs

Awards

Euroleague 2006–07 MVP 
  Theo Papaloukas, (  CSKA Moscow )

Euroleague 2006–07 Final Four MVP 
  Dimitris Diamantidis, (  Panathinaikos )

Euroleague 2006–07 Finals Top Scorer 
  Theo Papaloukas, (  CSKA Moscow )

All-Euroleague Team 2006–07 

*A tie resulted in the voting for the best point guard of the season, between Dimitris Diamantidis and Theo Papaloukas. Consequently, the 2006–07 All-Euroleague First Team included six players.

Rising Star 
  Rudy Fernández (  DKV Joventut )

Best Defender 
  Dimitris Diamantidis (  Panathinaikos )

Top Scorer (Alphonso Ford Trophy) 
  Igor Rakočević (  Tau Ceramica )

Top Scorer (Points Per Game leader) 
  Juan Carlos Navarro (  FC Barcelona )

Coach of the Year (Alexander Gomelsky Award) 
  Željko Obradović (  Panathinaikos )

Club Executive of the Year 
  Juan Manuel Rodríguez (  Unicaja )

Regular season

Top 16

Playoffs

MVP of the Month

References and notes 

Euroleague Competition Format

External links 
 Euroleague.net - Official Euroleague homepage.
 Eurobasket.com - Popular basketball news site.
 TalkBasket.net - Basketball forum.

 
EuroLeague seasons